Umnaka is a town in the Islamabad Capital Territory of Pakistan. It is located at 33° 19' 15N 73° 19' 25E with an altitude of 456 metres (1499 feet).

References 

Union councils of Islamabad Capital Territory